Christopher Jon Castile (born June 15, 1980) is a former American actor. His well-known roles include Ted Newton in Beethoven and Beethoven's 2nd, the voice of Zachary Sellers and Nick Mulligan in Focus on the Family's Adventures in Odyssey, Mark Foster on the sitcom Step by Step, and the voice of Eugene Horowitz in Hey Arnold!.

Castile retired from acting following the cancellation of Step By Step. He received a master's degree, he currently teaches political sciences as a professor at Biola University in La Mirada, California, and is teaching at Downey High School as a U.S. History teacher. His class is called Step By Step.

Credits

Awards and nominations 
Young Artist Award
1992: Nominated, "Best Young Actor Starring in a Television Series" – Step by Step
1992: Nominated, "Best Young Actor Starring in a Motion Picture" – Beethoven
1993: Nominated, "Outstanding Youth Ensemble in a Television Series" – Step by Step (shared w/cast)
1994: Nominated, "Best Performance by a Youth Ensemble in a Motion Picture" – Beethoven's 2nd (shared w/cast)
1996: Nominated, "Best Performance by a Young Actor in a TV Comedy Series" – Step by Step

References

External links 

1980 births
Living people
20th-century American male actors
21st-century American male actors
Actors from Orange County, California
American high school teachers
American male child actors
American male film actors
American male television actors
American male voice actors
Biola University faculty